"I'm an Old, Old Man (Tryin' to Live While I Can)" is a song written and sung by Frizzell and released on the Columbia label (catalog no. 21034). In December 1952, it peaked at No. 3 on Billboards country and western best seller chart. It spent nine weeks on the charts.

The song was later covered by Merle Haggard on If We Make It Through December (1974). After Frizzell died in 1975, Haggard wrote a tribute song, "Goodbye Lefty" that referenced the 1952 song: "But the old old man is gone. There'll be no more Lefty's songs."

The country rock band Rank and File also covered the song on its album Long Gone Dead (1984).

Andre Williams and The Sadies also covered the song on their album Red Dirt (1999).

References

Lefty Frizzell songs
1952 songs
Songs written by Lefty Frizzell